Menno Boelsma (8 January 1961 – 10 September 2022) was a Dutch speed skater. He competed at the 1988 Winter Olympics in the 500 m and 1000 m events and finished in 16th and 24th place, respectively.

Boelsma achieved his best results in the 500 m, winning a national title in 1986 and a silver medal at the World Cup in Davos in 1990.

Personal bests: 
500 m – 37.40 (1988)
1000 m – 1:15.33 (1988)
1500 m – 1:59.41 (1988)
5000 m – 7:47.2 (1984)

Boelsma died of cancer on 10 September 2022, at the age of 61.

References

1961 births
2022 deaths
Olympic speed skaters of the Netherlands
Speed skaters at the 1988 Winter Olympics
Dutch male speed skaters
Dutch male short track speed skaters
People from Monster
Sportspeople from South Holland